Regild Zeneli (born 29 June 1996) is an Albanian professional footballer who plays as a defender for Albanian club Kastrioti.

References

External links

Albanian Football Association profile

1996 births
Living people
Footballers from Tirana
Albanian footballers
Association football defenders
FK Partizani Tirana players
KF Tirana players
KS Turbina Cërrik players
Luftëtari Gjirokastër players
KF Korabi Peshkopi players
KS Kastrioti players